This is a list of team rosters by season for UCI Continental team and UCI Track Team .

Road

2023

2022

2021

2020

2019

2018

Track

2023

2021

2020

2018

2017

Notes

References

BEAT Cycling Club